Merja Makinen (born 1953) is director of communication and culture at Middlesex University. She is an expert on feminist writing of the twentieth century, particularly that of Angela Carter and Jeanette Winterson, and has written on the feminist aspects of popular genre fiction such as the books of Agatha Christie.

Selected publications
 Joyce Cary: A Descriptive Bibliography. Mansell, London, 1989. (with Kevin Harris) 
 "Angela Carter's "The Bloody Chamber" and the Decolonization of Feminine Sexuality", Feminist Review, No. 42, Feminist Fictions (Autumn 1992), pp. 2–15.
 Female fetishism: A new look. Lawrence & Wishart, 1994. (with Lorraine Gamman) 
 Feminist Popular Fiction. Palgrave, Basingstoke, 2001. 
 The Novels of Jeanette Winterson. Palgrave Macmillan, Basingstoke, 2005. 
 Agatha Christie: Investigating Femininity. Palgrave Macmillan, Basingstoke, 2006.

References 

Living people
1953 births
Literary scholars
British feminists
Academics of Middlesex University
20th-century non-fiction writers
21st-century non-fiction writers